Kalakalappu 2 is a 2018 Indian Tamil-language comedy film written and directed by Sundar C and produced by Khushbu. It is a spiritual sequel to the 2012 film Kalakalappu. The film features Jiiva, Jai, Shiva, Nikki Galrani and Catherine Tresa in the lead roles.

Though talks were going on since 2012, the film began production in October 2017 and progressed in locations including Varanasi, Karaikudi, Pune and Hyderabad. The film was released on 9 February 2018.

Plot

The movie starts with Raghu trying to kill his own father for not taking good care of his family. That is when he discovers that he owns an ancestral property in Kasi which was given as lease almost a century ago. At the same time, an IT raid takes place in a minister's house. The minister hands over the laptop having his property detail to his auditor, who demands five crores to hand over the laptop. In Kasi, Raghu's ancestral property is taken care by Srinivas alias Seenu, but he was unsuccessful in the business that he is doing. It is then shown that both Seenu and Raghu had been cheated by Ganesh. They move to Karaikudi to get hold of Ganesh and get back their money. Meanwhile, the minister starts his journey to get back the laptop. In Karaikudi, Ganesh and his two associates reveal that they want to cheat a billionaire in order to get valuable diamonds from him. Moreover, he assures to give back their money if they help him. After multiple attempts, they manage to get it overnight and plan to escape together. However, Ganesh sees Raghu with his girlfriend Aishwarya, whom he liked very much. He intends to cheat both Raghu and Seenu for his revenge. Seenu and Raghu find out about this later and chase after him. After multiple chases, the diamonds in a tusk cover are placed in a random train in the railway station. How Raghu and Seenu recover their money and how the minister retrieves the laptop forms the rest of the story.

Cast

Production 
Following the success of Kalakalappu (2012), G. Dhananjayan of the production company UTV Motion Pictures revealed that a sequel would be made with same cast and crew, with production beginning in October 2012. Despite the announcement, the project did not materialise and Sundar C moved on to complete Madha Gaja Raja. When UTV Motion Pictures and Sundar decided to collaborate again, Sundar was hesitant to make Kalakalappu 2 as it was "difficult to meet such high expectations" and subsequently worked on Theeya Velai Seiyanum Kumaru (2013) with the studio. In November 2013, it was reported that Sundar was keen to make another film for the franchise but would only retain Shiva and Santhanam for key roles from the original cast. However, as a result of his busy schedule in late 2014, Sundar stated that he would not work on a sequel and would prioritise other work. In April 2016, it was reported in the media that the makers had cast Arya and Nayanthara in the lead roles and that Siddharth Vipin would be the film's music composer. Khushbu later denied the reports and indicated that there were no immediate plans for a sequel by Sundar.

During mid-2017, Sundar C's big budget project, Sangamithra, became delayed and subsequently he looked to quickly complete another film before production started. The producers of Sangamithra, Sri Thenandal Films agreed to finance Kalakalappu 2 and the media widely speculated that actress Oviya would work on the film following her rise to fame through her appearance on the reality television show, Bigg Boss (2017). In late September 2017, it was confirmed that the producers had cast actors Jiiva, Jai, Nikki Galrani and Catherine Tresa in the lead roles, with Shiva being in discussions for a further role. Production was revealed to begin in early October 2017, with Hiphop Tamizha selected as the music composer.

The film began production on 4 October 2017 in Karaikudi, Tamil Nadu. Vaiyapuri amongst other supporting actors, joined the cast of the film during the first schedule, after Sundar C was impressed with Vaiyapuri's stint on the Tamil reality show, Bigg Boss (2017). The film was then shot non-stop for two months across Kasi, Pune, Bhor, Hyderabad and Chennai, as the team aimed to release the film in early 2018. In Varanasi, during a 20-day schedule, the film was shot at Ramnagar, Scindia Ghat, Assi Ghat and the lanes adjoining these ghats. Furthermore, several songs including a song on Holi were filmed during the stint. During the Hyderabad schedule at Ramoji Film City, actress Nandita Swetha joined the team to play a minor role.

Release
Tamil Nadu theatrical rights of the film were valued at 50 crore.

Box office

Soundtrack 
The film's music was composed by Hiphop Tamizha, while the audio rights of the film was acquired by Think Music India. The album was released through singles.

References

External links 

2018 films
Films shot in India
Films shot in Chennai
Indian comedy films
Indian slapstick comedy films
Films scored by Hiphop Tamizha
Indian sequel films
Films directed by Sundar C.
2010s Tamil-language films